Lenon Farias de Souza Leite (born 10 January 1996), commonly known as Lenon, is a Brazilian footballer who currently plays as a forward for General Díaz.

Career statistics

Club

Notes

References

1996 births
Living people
Brazilian footballers
Brazilian expatriate footballers
Association football forwards
Ascenso MX players
Mirassol Futebol Clube players
Araxá Esporte Clube players
Club Guaraní players
General Díaz footballers
Brazilian expatriate sportspeople in Paraguay
Expatriate footballers in Paraguay
People from Três Lagoas
Sportspeople from Mato Grosso do Sul